Maurice Fitzgerald (or FitzGerald) may refer to:

 Maurice Fitzgerald (footballer) (born 1969), Kerry Gaelic footballer who played from 1988 to 2001
 Maurice Fitzgerald (rugby league) (1917–1942), Australian rugby league footballer
 Maurice Fitzgerald (rugby union) (born 1976), English rugby union player
 Maurice A. FitzGerald (1897–1951), politician from New York City and former borough president of Queens

Individuals with titles
 Maurice FitzGerald, Lord of Lanstephan (c. 1105–1176), major figure in the Norman conquest of Ireland
 Maurice FitzGerald, 2nd Lord of Offaly (1194–1257), Lord Chief Justice of Ireland, founder of Sligo Abbey
 Maurice FitzGerald, 3rd Lord of Offaly (1238–1286), soldier and Justiciar of Ireland from 1272 to 1273

Earls of Desmond 
 Maurice FitzGerald, 1st Earl of Desmond (died 1356), Irish soldier and peer
 Maurice FitzGerald, 2nd Earl of Desmond (died 1358)
 Maurice FitzGerald, 9th Earl of Desmond (died 1520)

Earl of Kildare 
 Maurice FitzGerald, 4th Earl of Kildare (1318–1390)

Knights of Kerry 
 Maurice FitzGerald, 14th Knight of Kerry
 Maurice FitzGerald, 16th Knight of Kerry (c. 1734–1779), Irish MP for Dingle
 Maurice FitzGerald, 18th Knight of Kerry (1774–1849), Irish landowner and Whig MP for Kerry and Tralee
 Maurice Fitzgerald, 20th Knight of Kerry (1844–1916), Knight of Kerry

Dukes of Leinster 
 Maurice FitzGerald, 6th Duke of Leinster (1887–1922), Irish peer
 Maurice FitzGerald, 9th Duke of Leinster (born 1948), Irish peer